Agony aunts can refer to:

 Agony aunt, a colloquial term for an advice columnist
 Agony Aunts, a 2012 Australian comedy television series 
 Agony Uncles, a 2012 Australian comedy television series